Pike County is a county located on the southwestern border of the U.S. state of Mississippi. As of the 2020 census, the population was 40,324. The county seat is Magnolia. Pike County is named for explorer Zebulon Pike.

Pike County is part of the McComb, MS Micropolitan Statistical Area.

History
Pike County was formed from Marion County by an act of the Territorial General Assembly on December 9, 1815. Holmesville was selected as the county seat on December 11, 1816; it was named in honor of Major Andrew Hunter Holmes, an army officer killed in the War of 1812. In 1873 Magnolia was voted in as the new county seat. The county was devoted to agriculture and is still mostly rural.

Geography

Major highways

  Interstate 55
  U.S. Highway 51
  U.S. Highway 98
  Mississippi Highway 24
  Mississippi Highway 44
  Mississippi Highway 48
 Mississippi Highway 570
 Mississippi Highway 584

Adjacent counties
 Lincoln County (north)
 Walthall County (east)
 Washington Parish, Louisiana (southeast)
 Tangipahoa Parish, Louisiana (south)
 Amite County (west)

Demographics

2020 census

As of the 2020 United States Census, there were 40,324 people, 14,404 households, and 8,528 families residing in the county.

2010 census
As of the 2010 United States Census, there were 40,404 people living in the county. 51.5% were Black or African American, 46.4% White, 0.6% Asian, 0.3% Native American, 0.5% of some other race and 0.8% of two or more races. 1.2% were Hispanic or Latino (of any race).

2000 census
As of the census of 2000, there were 38,940 people, 14,792 households, and 10,502 families living in the county.  The population density was 95 people per square mile (37/km2).  There were 16,720 housing units at an average density of 41 per square mile (16/km2).  The racial makeup of the county was 51.25% White, 47.53% Black or African American, 0.19% Native American, 0.33% Asian, 0.01% Pacific Islander, 0.20% from other races, and 0.50% from two or more races.  0.73% of the population were Hispanic or Latino of any race.

There were 14,792 households, out of which 34.20% had children under the age of 18 living with them, 46.80% were married couples living together, 19.90% had a female householder with no husband present, and 29.00% were non-families. 26.50% of all households were made up of individuals, and 12.00% had someone living alone who was 65 years of age or older.  The average household size was 2.57 and the average family size was 3.12.

In the county, the population was spread out, with 27.70% under the age of 18, 10.10% from 18 to 24, 26.00% from 25 to 44, 22.10% from 45 to 64, and 14.20% who were 65 years of age or older.  The median age was 35 years. For every 100 females, there were 88.00 males.  For every 100 females age 18 and over, there were 83.20 males.

The median income for a household in the county was $24,562, and the median income for a family was $29,415. Males had a median income of $27,450 versus $17,405 for females. The per capita income for the county was $14,040.  About 21.50% of families and 25.30% of the population were below the poverty line, including 35.50% of those under age 18 and 19.70% of those age 65 or over.

Communities

Cities
 Magnolia (county seat)
 McComb

Towns
 Osyka
 Summit

Census-designated place
 Fernwood

Unincorporated communities
 Chatawa
 Holmesville
 Kirkville
 Pricedale
 Progress
  Sherman

Politics
Pike County is a swing county in presidential elections; since 2000 it has voted Democratic four times and Republican twice.

See also
 National Register of Historic Places listings in Pike County, Mississippi
 Fernwood Lumber Company
 History of Pike County Mississippi 1798-1876 by Luke W. Conerly 1909
 J. J. Carter, Pike County native who served in the late 19th century in the Louisiana House of Representatives and as mayor of Minden, Louisiana

References

 
Mississippi counties
McComb micropolitan area
1815 establishments in Mississippi Territory
Populated places established in 1815
Black Belt (U.S. region)
Majority-minority counties in Mississippi